Charles M. Hamburg (November 22, 1863 – May 18, 1931) was a Major League Baseball left fielder in the 19th century.  The Louisville, Kentucky native played for his hometown team, the American Association Louisville Colonels, in 1890.  
  
Hamburg played major league ball for just one season, but it was a season to remember.  He played in 133 of the Colonels 136 games, and they won the American Association championship with a record of 88-44-4. The Colonels went on to tie the National League Brooklyn Bridegrooms 3-3-1 in the 1890 version of the World Series.

Hamburg contributed significantly to his team's success with 3 home runs, 77 runs batted in, 93 runs scored, a .272 batting average, and an on-base percentage of .370.  His 77 RBI were seventh in the league, and the 69 bases on balls he received ranked him tenth.

He died at the age of 67 in Union, New Jersey.

External links

Retrosheet

19th-century baseball players
Major League Baseball left fielders
Baseball players from Kentucky
Louisville Colonels players
1931 deaths
1863 births
Minor league baseball managers
Columbus Stars players
Bridgeport Giants players
Buffalo Bisons (minor league) players
St. Paul Apostles players
Duluth Whalebacks players
Mobile Blackbirds players
Milwaukee Brewers (minor league) players
Harrisburg Senators players
Rochester Browns players
Lancaster Maroons players
Philadelphia Athletics (minor league) players
Paterson Silk Weavers players
Canandaigua Giants players
Oswego Grays players
Elmira Pioneers players
Rome Romans players
Troy Trojans (minor league) players
Greenville Grays players
Hattiesburg (minor league baseball) players
Columbia Skyscrapers players